Powell–McMullan House is a historic home located near Stanardsville, Greene County, Virginia.  The original house was built about 1800 and expanded in 1842. It is a two-story, frame dwelling in a vernacular Greek Revival style. It has a metal-sheathed gable roof, exterior gable-end brick chimneys, and a one-story hipped roof front porch.

It was listed on the National Register of Historic Places in 2000.

References

Houses on the National Register of Historic Places in Virginia
Greek Revival houses in Virginia
Houses completed in 1800
Houses in Greene County, Virginia
National Register of Historic Places in Greene County, Virginia